Bou Saada Airport  , also known as Ain Eddis Airport, is an airport located  north of Bou Saada, Algeria.

Airlines and destinations

References

External links 
 Google Maps - Bou Saada

 

Airports in Algeria
Buildings and structures in M'Sila Province